The Plain Language Act 2022 (2022 No 54) is an Act of Parliament in New Zealand. The Act specifies the requirement of government officials to use plain, easily understood language when communicating with the public. It received royal assent on 21 October 2022.

References

External links 
 New Zealand Electoral Commission's website

2022 in New Zealand law
Statutes of New Zealand
Constitution of New Zealand